Jelovec ( or ); is a settlement on the left bank of the Mirna River in the Municipality of Sevnica in central Slovenia. The area is part of the historical region of Lower Carniola. The municipality is now included in the Lower Sava Statistical Region. 

A bridge over the Mirna River in the settlement was built between 1936 and 1938.

References

External links
Jelovec at Geopedia

Populated places in the Municipality of Sevnica